Supertek Computers Inc. was a computer company founded in Santa Clara, California in 1985 by Mike Fung, an ex-Hewlett-Packard project manager, with the aim of designing and selling low-cost minisupercomputers compatible with those from Cray Research.

Its first product was the Supertek S-1, a compact, air-cooled, CMOS clone of the Cray X-MP vector processor supercomputer running the CTSS (Cray Time Sharing System) operating system, and later a version of Unix. This was launched in 1989; although Supertek had raised US$21.4 million in venture capital, only $5 million of this was needed to develop the S-1. Only ten units were sold before Supertek was acquired by Cray Research in 1990. The S-1 was subsequently sold for a brief time by Cray as the Cray XMS.

At the time of the acquisition the Supertek S-2, a clone of the Cray Y-MP, was under development. This was eventually launched as the Cray Y-MP EL in 1992.

References 

Cray
1985 establishments in California
1990 disestablishments in California
American companies established in 1985
American companies disestablished in 1990
Companies based in Santa Clara, California
Computer companies established in 1985
Computer companies disestablished in 1990
Defunct companies based in the San Francisco Bay Area
Defunct computer companies based in California
Defunct computer companies of the United States
Defunct computer hardware companies
Technology companies based in the San Francisco Bay Area
Vector supercomputers